The J & J Ultralights Tukan is an American ultralight trike that was marketed by J & J Ultralights, Leading Edge Air Foils and Kemmeries Aviation. The aircraft was supplied as a kit, as parts and as plans for amateur construction.

Design and development
It features a cable-braced hang glider-style high wing, weight-shift controls, an open cockpit, tricycle landing gear and a single engine in pusher configuration.

The aircraft is made from bolted-together aluminum tubing, with its single-surface wing covered in Dacron sailcloth. Its  span wing is supported by a single tube-type kingpost and uses an "A" frame control bar. The landing gear uses fiberglass rods for mainwheel suspension and the nosewheel features a drum brake. The pilot is accommodated on a seat that can be quickly converted into a tandem second seat. The standard wing supplied was a J & J single-surface wing, but other wings of suitable gross weight can be used. The specified powerplant is the  Rotax 447 twin-cylinder, two-stroke, single-ignition aircraft engine.

Assembly time from the kit is about 30 hours. The aircraft can be disassembled for ground transport in a van or pickup truck or storage by one person in 25 minutes. The Tukan can be used for crop spraying and also hang glider towing. Thirty examples were reported as completed and flying in February 2000.

Specifications (J & J Tukan)

See also

References

External links
J & J website archives on Archive.org
Photo of J & J Tukan

1990s United States ultralight aircraft
Homebuilt aircraft
Single-engined pusher aircraft
Parasol-wing aircraft
Ultralight trikes
Aircraft manufactured in the United States
Leading Edge Air Foils aircraft